Closed loop or closed-loop may refer to:

Mathematics
 Loop (topology), a path whose initial point is equal to its terminal point
 Closed curve, a mathematical curve described as a set of continuous parametric equations over a closed interval of real numbers for which the start point equals the end point

Technology
 A feedback loop, often found in:
 Closed-loop transfer function, where a closed-loop controller may be used
 Electronic feedback loops in electronic circuits
 PID controller, a commonly used closed-loop controller
 Closed ecological system not relying on matter exchange outside of the system, as opposed to open loop
 Closed-loop communication, a communication technique used to avoid misunderstandings
 Ecological sanitation systems or ecosan, intended to close the nutrient and water cycle
 Pulling water from one area of a reef aquarium and pumping it immediately elsewhere in the tank to create higher flow and minimize dead spots

Other uses
 Circular economy, one in which materials are consistently reused rather than discharged as waste
 Closed time loop, or predestination paradox, a paradox of time travel that is often used as a convention in science fiction
 Knot loop, a structure used to tie knots

See also 
 Short circuit